Saint-Priest-Taurion is a commune in the Haute-Vienne department in the Nouvelle-Aquitaine region in west-central France. Its area code is 87178 and, its zip code is 87480.

See also
Communes of the Haute-Vienne department

References

Communes of Haute-Vienne